Xu Dongdong (born 16 February 1990) is a Chinese actress, singer and model.

Xu first rose to prominence in 2016 for playing Shen Jiawen, a drug trafficker, in the television series Yu Zui, which attracted more than 100 million views on iQiyi within days of its premiere, making it one of the most popular TV series tailored for the online platform.

Early life and education
Xu was born in Harbin, Heilongjiang on February 16, 1990. At the age of 7, she moved to Beijing. She graduated from the People's Liberation Army Academy of Art.

Career
Xu had her first experience in front of the camera in 2007, and she was chosen to act as a support actor in Tears in the Red City, a television series starring Cao Lan and Li Dongbei. And she subsequently appearing on Oriental King Lion.

Xu had a minor role as Yue Rong in Chen Xiang (2010), which starred Li Yapeng, Tommy Tam, Wu Mian, and Xu Huanshan.

Xu's first film role was a policewoman uncredited appearance in the romance film Eternal Moment (2011). It stars Li Yapeng, Xu Jinglei, Wang Xuebing, and Je Jie. The film grossed ¥200 million on a budget of only ¥10 million.

In 2012, Xu appeared in television series, such as Master Lin in Seoul, The Sent-down Youth and Angry Photographer. She was cast in the gangster television series Skynet 2012. Other cast members are Du Zhiguo, Du Chun, Dai Jiaoqian, and Wu Ma. She participated in Jin Tailang's Happy Life, a romance television series starring Song Dandan, Li Xiaolu and Wang Lei.

Xu appeared as Na Na, a beautiful girl who appeared in the bar, in the thriller film Flash Play (2013). It stars Alex Fong, Zhang Xinyu, Chrissie Chau, Lee Wei, and Timmy Hung. She starred with Purba Rgyal in Letter of  Tour. That same year, she starred in the romantic comedy television series Gorgeous Workers, alongside Hans Zhang, Choo Ja-hyun, Ken Chu, and Wu Peirou.

In 2014, Xu played the lead role in the suspense horror thriller mystery film Closed Doors Village. She had a cameo appearance in Lord of Shanghai, an action film starring Hu Jun, Yu Nan, Rhydian Vaughan, and Qin Hao. That same year, she played the drillmaster Meng Xue, the lead role in The First Paratrooper Team, costarring Purba Rgyal and Shao Bing.
 
Xu had a minor role as Jenni in Love Contractually (2015), which starred Sammi Cheng and Joseph Chang.

In 2016, Xu had key supporting role in the Yu Zui, created by iQiyi. She was praised for her role. After Yu Zui was broadcast, it enjoyed the highest ratings in China and she quickly rose to prominence.  She made a guest appearance on Wong Jing's Mission Milano, a Chinese-Hong Kong action adventure comedy film starring Andy Lau, Huang Xiaoming, Shen Teng, Wong Cho-lam, Michelle Hu and Ouyang Nana. She also appeared in Wong Jing and Andrew Lau's From Vegas to Macau III, an action film starring Chow Yun-fat, Andy Lau, Nick Cheung and Li Yuchun. She played Shi Ying in the historical romance drama film Chinese Wine, opposite Van Fan and Huang Yi.

Xu appeared in Chasing the Dragon, an action crime drama film directed by Wong Jing and Jason Kwan. The film stars Andy Lau reprising his role as Lee Rock from the film series of the same name, Donnie Yen as Crippled Ho, based on real life gangster Ng Sik-ho.

Filmography

Film

TV series

MV

Music

References

External links

1990 births
People from Harbin
People's Liberation Army Academy of Art alumni
Living people
21st-century Chinese actresses
Chinese television actresses
Chinese film actresses
Actresses from Heilongjiang
21st-century Chinese women singers